Sant'Ippolito is a municipality in the Province of Pesaro e Urbino in the Italian region Marche.

Sant'Ippolito may also refer to:

 Sant'Ippolito (hill), a hill in Sicily
 Sant'Ippolito, Rome, a church in Nomentano, Viale delle Provincie, Rome

See also 
 Santi Ippolito e Cassiano (disambiguation)
 Ippolito